Voerendaal railway station is located in Voerendaal, the Netherlands and is served by Arriva. It became national heritage site #507164 on 27 March 1997.

Train service
The following local train services call at this station:
Stoptrein S4: Maastricht–Heerlen

References

Railway stations in Limburg (Netherlands)
Railway stations on the Heuvellandlijn
Buildings and structures in Voerendaal